State Road 35 (NM 35) is a  state highway in the U.S. state of New Mexico. Its southern terminus is in the village of San Lorenzo at NM 152, and the northern terminus is at NM 15.

Major intersections

See also

References

035
Transportation in Grant County, New Mexico